Ambulyx semifervens is a species of moth of the  family Sphingidae. It originates from Indonesia (the Moluccas and Sulawesi).

It is similar to Ambulyx subocellata and Ambulyx dohertyi, but the wings are broader and the distal margin of the forewing is more convex.

References

Ambulyx
Moths described in 1865
Moths of Indonesia